Zelanda is a genus of South Pacific ground spiders that was first described by H. Özdikmen in 2009.

Species
 it contains six species, all found in New Zealand:
Zelanda elongata (Forster, 1979) – New Zealand
Zelanda erebus (L. Koch, 1873) (type) – New Zealand
Zelanda kaituna (Forster, 1979) – New Zealand
Zelanda miranda (Forster, 1979) – New Zealand
Zelanda obtusa (Forster, 1979) – New Zealand
Zelanda titirangia (Ovtsharenko, Fedoryak & Zakharov, 2006) – New Zealand

References

Araneomorphae genera
Gnaphosidae
Spiders of New Zealand